Plasmodium robinsoni is a parasite of the genus Plasmodium subgenus Sauramoeba. 

Like all Plasmodium species P. robinsoni has both vertebrate and insect hosts. The vertebrate hosts for this parasite are lizards.

Description 

The species was first described by Brygoo in 1962 in the chameleon (Chamaeleo brevicornis).

Geographical occurrence 

This species is found in Madagascar.

Clinical features and host pathology 

This species is known to infect the chameleon species Chamaeleo brevicornis and Chamaelo parsoni crucifer.

References 

robinsoni